(German for "free economy") is an economic idea founded by Silvio Gesell in 1916. He called it  (natural economic order). In 1932, a group of Swiss businessmen used his ideas to found the WIR Bank (WIR).

Structure
Freiwirtschaft consists of three central aspects, usually summed up as the Three Fs:
  (free money)
 All money is issued for a limited period by constant value (neither inflation, nor deflation).
 Long-term saving requires investment in bonds or stocks.
  (free land)
 All land is commonly owned or else the property of public institutions and can only be rented from the community or from government, respectively, not purchased (see also Georgism).
  (free trade)

History 
The basic economic ideas of Freiwirtschaft were published in 1890 by the Hungarian-Austrian economist Theodor Hertzka in his novel Freiland - ein soziales Zukunftsbild (Freeland - A Social Anticipation).

Flaws of the monetary system 
Freiwirtschaft claims that current monetary systems are flawed. In mainstream economics, prices convey information. For example, dropping prices on a product mean that there is less demand or more supply of that product. This leads to a buyer buying more, or a seller/producer starting to sell/produce something else, thereby reducing the supply of that product. As a reaction, assuming constant desirability, the price of the product rises again. So, the price, together with the market participants, builds up a feedback loop around a stable, "ideal" price. At this stable price, the market is ideal, no one pays too much or earns too little, and there are no tendencies from either party to change that price. The "wobbling" around that ideal price is called self-stabilizing.

The key error of the current system, according to Gesell, is the ill-transported information in the price. Money is nothing but a claim for goods and services, usable in the economies that accept money in exchange for the former. In a weak economy, money is worth less in goods. But instead of an inflation, the result is a deflation as described above, and less money can now buy the same goods. This feedback loop is self-destabilizing, according to the Freiwirtschaft theory.

References

Sources
 Helmut Creutz, The Money Syndrome – Towards a Market Economy Free from Crises, Upfront Publishing 2010.
 Günter Bartsch, Die NWO-Bewegung Silvio Gesells – Geschichtlicher Grundriß 1891-1992/93. Gauke, Lütjenburg 1994.
 Knulp Goeke, Die verteilungspolitische Problematik der Freiwirtschaftslehre. Cologne 1961.
 Johannes Heinrichs, Sprung aus dem Teufelskreis. Sozialethische Wirtschaftstheorie Vol. I, Munich 2005.
 Hans-Joachim Werner, Geschichte der Freiwirtschaftsbewegung. 100 Jahre Kampf für eine Marktwirtschaft ohne Kapitalismus. Waxmann, Münster 1990.

External links
 Introduction to Freiwirtschaft
 Materialien zur Geld-, Zins- und Schuldenproblematik (in German, partly English)
 Fairconomy (in German, partly English)

 
Local currencies
Economic ideologies
Schools of economic thought
Monetary reform
Left-libertarianism